Resident Evil Survivor is a first-person light gun shooter video game developed by Tose and published by Capcom. It was released on the PlayStation in Japan on January 27, 2000, in Europe on March 31, 2000, and in North America on August 30, 2000. It is a spin-off of the Resident Evil video game series. It is also the first first-person perspective Resident Evil game predating Resident Evil 7: Biohazard by seventeen years. A Microsoft Windows version was released only in China and Taiwan on September 7, 2002.

As the first release of the Gun Survivor series, this game was a major difference from the main Resident Evil series, substituting the third-person perspective of the previous games to a first-person view. The Japanese and European versions of the game were compatible with Namco's GunCon/G-Con 45 light gun, making it one of the first off-rail light gun games, whereas light-gun compatibility was removed from the North American release due to shooting games being partly blamed for the motivation of the then-recent Columbine High School massacre. It was followed by Resident Evil Survivor 2 – Code: Veronica.

Gameplay
The player takes control of an amnesiac protagonist, struggling desperately against overwhelming odds to stay alive and uncover his identity. Survivor's gameplay is a combination of first-person shooter and arcade-style light gun shooter. The player views the environment from the perspective of the character (first-person view) and moves the character through the environment with the controller. At the same time, if the player wishes to attack an enemy or destroy an object, they press a button which allows them to control a crosshair on the screen. This crosshair can be moved to any location within the main character's line of sight. When using a light gun, players move around by shooting off screen to move and the side buttons to turn, and point at the screen to shoot enemies.

The game borrows its enemies from Resident Evil 2, featuring the zombie models from that game, as well as creatures such as Lickers, the Ivy plants, Moth Giants and Tyrants. In addition, Survivor also reintroduces the original Hunters from the first Resident Evil and features two new enemies in the form of the Umbrella Trashsweeper unit – soldiers armed with machine guns – and the Hypnos T-Type, a new Tyrant model that evolves into different forms.
The player's arsenal consists almost entirely of pistols, such as the Glock 17 and the CZ75 with unlimited ammo. As the protagonist progresses through the game, the player receives larger weapons to aid in defending against even more dangerous opposition while they make their way through Umbrella's ruined city and shadowy research labs.
The game features branching paths that allow the player to determine how the story will unfold and whom they will meet along the way.

Plot
The game takes place after the missile explosion that wiped out the contaminated Raccoon City. Not long after this incident, a helicopter crashes on the outskirts of Umbrella Corporation's private township, located on Sheena Island. The pilot escapes the burning wreckage only to find himself fighting a battle against the living dead, with no memory of his identity or his reasons for being there.

During his quest, he comes across a man named Andy Holland, who knows him as Vincent Goldman, the man said to be responsible for the outbreak of T-virus in the island. Due to his amnesia, he assumes this as a fact. Moments after he gets out of the city, "Vincent" comes across Umbrella's facility, where he meets Lott and Lily Klein, two siblings whose parents used to work for Umbrella. They misjudge him because they were made to believe that Umbrella stands for the common good of all people. The two kids run away from him during their encounter, as "Vincent" follows the children outside the facility, through the canal system, and eventually to their house. He finds Lily in the house and learns from her that Lott has gone to a nearby factory alone to find a way off the island.

Upon learning this, "Vincent" tells Lily to stay and take refuge until he comes back with Lott. He finds his way to the place and, after encountering many monsters, successfully infiltrates the Umbrella research facility just in time to save Lott from a Hunter. "Vincent" then learns from Lott that he is, in fact, Ark Thompson, that he was sent to Sheena Island by Leon S. Kennedy, and that Lott knew who Vincent Goldman really was. Due to his knowledge, Vincent later became a vehement enemy of Ark. However, upon this realization, the facility suddenly activates a self-destruct system that will obliterate the island within 10 minutes. Lott tells Ark that within the facility, there is a railway station that runs underground. Ark tells Lott to go ahead to the station first and regroup there.

However, along his way to the station, Ark encounters the real Vincent and the Hypnos T-type Tyrant. Much to his surprise, the Umbrella executive is killed by the new bio-organic weapon, which then turns its attention to Ark, who manages to hold it off long enough to make a getaway. Ark reaches the railway station and sees Lott and Lily, safe and waiting for him. Using the railway station, they are able to arrive at a landing zone, where a helicopter waits. But on their way to safety, the Hypnos Tyrant shows up again, in a more mutated form. Ark manages to hold off the beast before joining the children in the helicopter. Persistent on its pursuit, the Tyrant leaps onto the helicopter, and Ark kills it firing it off the helicopter with one of the helicopter's missiles, and then kills it with a second one. As the sun rises, Ark, Lily, and Lott flee from Sheena Island together safely, just as the island's complex self-destructs.

Reception

The PlayStation version received "unfavorable" reviews according to the review aggregation website Metacritic. Jon Thompson (AllGame) gave the game a negative review. Thompson noted that the biggest critique of the game was that it was made to be played with a light gun, which the American version did not support. He continued that even the Japanese version of the game which did include it, "really wasn't any better. Shooters are supposed to be quick, raw and visceral, the total opposite of what Resident Evil is, for better or worse. This shooting game opts to stick with the slow pacing of the rest of the series, and the result is a gun game with no gun that absolutely crawls along." Thompson critiqued the graphics as being "not very attractive" and "very pixelated close-up" Edge praised the Japanese import's well-rendered 3D environments, but criticized the long loading screens between opening and closing doors. The magazine concluded that the Japanese import is best suited to the rental market, describing it as "more of a cash-in than a knockout." Eric Bratcher of NextGen said of the game, "The RE universe could definitely inspire a great gun game. But with bad technology, unforgivable control limitations, and an uncanny lack of fun, this non-gun game definitely isn't it." In Japan, however, Famitsu gave it a score of 31 out of 40.

Sequels
The Gun Survivor series was followed by three sequels, which were released for the PlayStation 2 and utilised the G-Con 2 peripheral. Resident Evil Survivor 2 – Code: Veronica was released for the PlayStation 2 in 2002, based on the characters and enemies of Resident Evil – Code: Veronica. Dino Stalker, a spin-off of the Dino Crisis series, was also released in 2002. A fourth game, Resident Evil: Dead Aim, was released in 2003.

Notes

References

External links
 (Japanese)

2000 video games
Capcom games
Eidos Interactive games
First-person shooters
Light gun games
PlayStation (console) games
Resident Evil spin-off games
Single-player video games
Tose (company) games
Video games about amnesia
Video games developed in Japan
Video games set in 1998
Video games set on fictional islands
Windows games